Hans Walter Wolff (December 17, 1911 – October 22, 1993) was a German Protestant theologian. He was professor at the University of Mainz from 1959  to 1967, and from 1967 to 1978 he was Professor of Old Testament at the University of Heidelberg.

Selected works
 Amos the Prophet (1973)
 The Old Testament: A Guide to Its Writings (1973)
 Anthropology of the Old Testament (1974)
 The Vitality of Old Testament Traditions (1975, with Walter Brueggemann)
 Hosea (1977)
 Joel and Amos (1977)
 Micah (1981)
 Haggai (1990)
 Obadiah and Jonah (1991)

See also
Christoph Wolff – his son

20th-century German Protestant theologians
Old Testament scholars
German biblical scholars
Heidelberg University alumni
1911 births
1993 deaths
German male non-fiction writers